Manaé Feleu (born 3 February 2000) is a French rugby union player who plays for FC Grenoble Amazones and the France women's national rugby union team.

Personal life
Born on the Futuna Islands, to Valerie and Nisie, she has three siblings: Niue, Teani, and Asia. Her parents were the only physical education teachers on her island and they introduced rugby into the school and set up clubs to play matches. From the age of 14 she studied in Hawke's Bay, New Zealand for three years at Woodford House.

Feleu moved to Grenoble with her sister Teani in 2020 to study medicine. She combines training to become a surgeon with rugby training.

Career
Feleu made her international debut for France against England in Grenoble on 14 November 2020 before being selected again a year later. She was named in France's team for the delayed 2021 Rugby World Cup in New Zealand. She featured in the games against South Africa and Fiji at the World Cup.

References

2000 births
Living people
French female rugby union players